Homecoming is a 1996 American made-for-television drama film starring Anne Bancroft.

On April 14, 1996, Homecoming aired on the American cable channel, Showtime. The screenplay was written by Christopher Carlson and was based on Cynthia Voigt's novel, Homecoming. The movie follows the story of four children who were abandoned by their mother and left to fend for themselves. Homecoming was directed by Mark Jean, produced by Jack Baran, and the executive producer was Shirō Sasaki. This drama is rated PG and has a running time of 105 minutes.

Homecoming did not win any awards, despite being nominated for a total of five. Anne Bancroft was nominated for Outstanding Performance by a Female Actor in a TV Movie or Miniseries by the Screen Actors Guild. Christopher Carlson and Mark Jean were nominated for Adapted Long Form by the Writers Guild of America, USA. The movie gathered three Young Artist Awards nominations: Best Family TV Movie or Mini-Series - Cable, Best Performance in a TV Movie/Home Video - Young Ensemble, and Kimberlee Peterson was nominated for Best Performance in a TV Movie/Mini-Series - Young Actress.

Plot
On a hot summer night in Pewauket, Connecticut, Liza Tillerman abandons her four children, thirteen-year-old Dicey, ten-year-old James, nine-year-old Maybeth, and six-year-old Sammy, in a mall. With only a change of underwear, socks, a map, and nine dollars, Dicey, James, Maybeth, and Sammy take off on foot to Bridgeport where their nearest known relative, Aunt Cilla, lives. Along the way, Dicey struggles to care for and protect her siblings.

After finally arriving at Aunt Cilla's, Eunice, their cousin, tells them that Aunt Cilla had died last spring. Eunice consults Father Joseph, who decides that the children may stay but only temporarily. Eunice tells Dicey of Abigail Tillerman, their grandmother, who lives in Crisfield, Maryland, and gives them some money. Dicey decides to take her siblings to their grandmother's house, but upon arriving they realize they do not know where she lives. While stopping at a store, a woman tells them that Abigail doesn't have a phone and is isolated clear out of town. Dicey decides to meet her alone, so she leaves James in charge of Maybeth and Sammy.

After knocking on the door and getting no answer, Dicey goes around back to see Mrs. Tillerman sitting on the back porch. Dicey asks if she can do anything to help on the farm. Mrs. Tillerman silently marches back into the house before asking Dicey to join her.

Inside, she questions Dicey about her thoughts on death and other such morbid things. Upon realizing she needs to just get up and leave, Abigail tells Dicey that Eunice wrote to warn her the children would be coming, and that she knows who Dicey is. However, she will not let the children stay. Dicey fires back, stating she doesn't want to stay. In the midst of the fierce conversation that ensues, Abigail begins to laugh and softens Dicey's mood a little. Abigail and Dicey take her boat to pick up the other children, and Dicey is scared when she doesn't see her siblings. Eventually, Dicey and Abigail find Sammy, who says James and Maybeth wanted to meet Abigail themselves and have already left. They return to Abigail's to find James and Maybeth just arriving.

Over the next few days, the children help their grandmother around the farm and with the cooking, and Abigail begins to warm toward them. However, Abigail tells Dicey she can't let the children stay with her; she is too old, has no money and fears making the same mistakes she made with her own children. One day while they stay over, Abigail receives a letter from Eunice discovering that Liza is found from the police and is discovered she has gone mentally insane, with a photo for evidence. Liza is put in a mental institution and is suffering from catatonia, closely enough to being schizophrenic. The people of the mental institution deem she will not be cured. Later on during their stay, Abigail insists the children must go back to Bridgeport and arranges for them to take the morning bus. As they wait for the bus, defeated, Abigail realizes she wants the children to stay after all.

Cast
 Kimberlee Peterson as Dicey Tillerman
 Trever O'Brien as James Tillerman
 Hanna R. Hall as Maybeth Tillerman
 William Greenblatt as Sammy Tillerman
 Anne Bancroft as Abigail Tillerman
 Anna Louise Richardson as Liza Tillerman (Momma)
 Scott Michael Campbell as Windy
 Bonnie Bedelia as Eunice Logan

Notes

External links
 
 Homecoming full movie on Youtube

1996 television films
1996 drama films
1996 films
Films set in Connecticut
Showtime (TV network) films
American drama television films
Films directed by Mark Jean
1990s American films